State Road 171 (NM 171) was  a  state highway in the US state of New Mexico by the City of Truth or Consequences. NM 171's western terminus was at NM 181 in the City of Elephant Butte, and the eastern terminus was at NM 195 in Elephant Butte. It is now maintained by the City of Elephant Butte as Warm Springs Boulevard.

History

NM 171 was part of the original routing of NM 52 east of Interstate 25 (US 85). By the 1950s, this road had been bypassed by a new alignment of NM 52 further to the north, and was removed from the state highway system. In the 1988 renumbering, it was reestablished as NM 171. On October 16, 2014, NM 171 was given to the city of Elephant Butte, along with the portion of NM 195 in the city.

Major intersections

See also

 List of state roads in New Mexico

References

External links

171
Transportation in Sierra County, New Mexico